The Sigiri Bridge is a three span bridge which collapsed while under construction over the Nzoia River, Budalangi, Busia in
Kenya.

Structural design 
Sigiri Bridge is a multi span deck-type plate girder bridge. 
The bridge is supported by two abutments 100m apart and two piers located 25m from the abutments.
The bridge deck is divided into three spans with each of the two flank spans extending beyond the piers by 9m resulting in a mid-span length of 32m.
The three deck spans are designed as composite steel and reinforced concrete decks consisting of 12 steel I-beams which together with the concrete above act as composite T-beams.

Collapse during construction 
At the time, the flank span on the southern side of the river had been concreted and the placing of concrete to the mid-span deck had been completed the weekend before while the northern span had not been cast.

Reconstruction launched 
The contractor of the bridge COVEC accepted responsibility for the collapse of the bridge and the Kenyan Government have launched reconstruction of the works.

Reconstructed bridge opened to the public 

References 
https://qz.com/africa/1015554/a-chinese-built-bridge-collapsed-in-kenya-two-weeks-after-it-was-inspected-by-the-president/

https://edition.cnn.com/2017/07/03/africa/kenya-bridge-collapse/index.html
 http://www.capitalfm.co.ke/news/2017/06/govt-launches-probe-into-cause-of-sigiri-bridge-collapse/ Government launches probe into cause of Sigiri bridge collapse
 http://bac-engineering.com/2015/index.php/portfolio-items/sigiri-bridge-and-approach-roads-project/?portfolioCats=31
 https://www.standardmedia.co.ke/article/2001287700/uhuru-to-open-sh992-million-sigiri-bridge
Bridges in Kenya